Florschütz is a German surname. Notable people with the surname include:

André Florschütz (born 1976), German luger
Thomas Florschütz (born 1978), German bobsledder

German-language surnames